Hasan Salihamidžić (born 1 January 1977), nicknamed Brazzo ("Little Bro"), is a Bosnian former professional footballer and current sporting director of Bundesliga club Bayern Munich. After starting his club career with German side Hamburger SV, he made a name for himself while playing for Bayern Munich for nine seasons with whom he won the Bundesliga title six times, DFB-Pokal title four times, the 2000–01 UEFA Champions League and the 2001 Intercontinental Cup. He also played for Italian club Juventus for four seasons.

During his career, Salihamidžić usually played as a right midfielder or full back. He was a quick and energetic player with an extremely high work rate. He was also gifted with good crossing and passing abilities, which allowed him to create chances for his teammates.

He earned 42 caps and scored six goals for the Bosnia and Herzegovina national team. He is regarded by many as one of the most successful Bosnian football players.

Following the end of his one-year contract with VfL Wolfsburg in 2012, Salihamidžić retired from professional football. He then worked for Sky Deutschland, RTL and ZDF, before re-joining Bayern Munich as sporting director in 2017.

Early life 
Salihamidžić's father Ahmed and mother Šefika gave him the nickname "Braco", meaning "little brother" in Bosnian, since Hasan has an older sister, hence his current nickname "Brazzo". He finished elementary school and played in the local club. Then, Salihamidžić moved to Velež Mostar where he stayed until 1992. That year, Salihamidžić was called up to the Yugoslavia under-16 team, for a match against the CIS under-16 team in Belgrade. Days after the match, the Army of Republika Srpska began a siege on the Bosnian capital Sarajevo, forcing his father to look for opportunities in Western Europe for his son.

Club career

Hamburger SV 
In November 1992, Salihamidžić moved to Hamburg, Germany, with the assistance of Ahmed Halilhodžić (cousin of football coach Vahid Halilhodžić), who was also a Jablanica native and had emigrated to Germany. Through Ahmed Halilhodžić's help, Salihamidžić joined the youth team of Bundesliga side Hamburger SV. He remained within the club's youth system for three seasons before being promoted to the senior squad. In his first season with the seniors, Salihamidžić made nine appearances, scoring two league goals. The following season, Salihamidžić became an integral part of the squad as he would make 37 appearances and score an impressive seven goals between Europe and the league. He would go on to make 31 league appearances, scoring ten goals during the 1997–98 season, which would be his last for the club before his high-profile transfer to Bundesliga giants Bayern Munich.

Bayern Munich 
Salihamidžić's transfer to Bayern Munich was completed during the 1998 summer transfer window, for an undisclosed fee. In his first season with his new club, 1998–99, Salihamidžić was instantly inserted into the club's starting line-up and made an impressive 43 appearances in all competitions, scoring five goals. During his first season, he came on as a substitute in the 89th minute of the 1999 UEFA Champions League Final against Manchester United.

Salihamidžić would make an additional 46 appearances with three more goals in his second season for the Munich giants, in 1999–2000. His third season proved very successful as well, as he would score six goals in 46 appearances. Between 2001 and 2003, however, Salihamidžić lacked in appearances, mostly due to injury; he made just 50 appearances between both seasons in all competitions.

For the 2003–04 season, the Bosnian international worked his way back into the starting line-up for the entire season, making 47 appearances and scoring five goals, also tallying 43 appearances and five goals the following season.

Salihamidžić was limited to just 29 appearances for the 2005–06 season, but made 42 seasonal appearances in his final season with the club, in which he also scored five goals. One of Salihamidžić's most memorable plays in 2006–07 was in the Champions League round of 16 second leg against Real Madrid, where he dispossessed Roberto Carlos and fed the pass to Roy Makaay, who beat goalkeeper Iker Casillas and set the record for the fastest goal in tournament history, at 11 seconds after kickoff. This helped Bayern overcome a 3–2 loss from the first leg to level the tie at 2–1 and advance on the away goals rule.

As he spent many years being so loved in Munich and his children are from the city, Salihamidžić settled there when his playing career was over.

Juventus 

On 15 January 2007, Salihamidžić signed a four-year pre-deal with Juventus. He joined them the following June after his contract with Bayern had expired. In his first season, under coach Claudio Ranieri, Salihamidžić was a regular starter, albeit with injury lay-offs, and made 30 official appearances for his new club, scoring an impressive five goals which included two in a 3–2 victory against Milan on 12 April 2008. His second and third season with the club, however, proved to be less successful as he suffered from several injury lay-offs.

In the 2010–11 season, new coach Luigi Delneri excluded Salihamidžić from the team's plans. Along with Fabio Grosso, Salihamidžić was the only healthy first-team player that was excluded from the 25-men 2010–11 UEFA Europa League squad. Salihamidžić was released from Juventus when his contract expired in June 2011.

VfL Wolfsburg 
On 4 July 2011, Salihamidžić moved to VfL Wolfsburg on a one-year contract. On 9 July 2011, in a friendly game against local team Bismark, Salihamidžić's left arm was broken in a challenge with another player.

International career 
 
Salihamidžić made his international debut for Bosnia and Herzegovina on 8 October 1996 against Croatia. On 6 November 1996, he scored the team's first goal in a friendly 2–1 win over Italy. During his 11 years with the national team, the closest they came was falling one goal short in a match against Denmark that would have enabled them to qualify for UEFA Euro 2004. He has earned a total of 42 caps, scoring 6 goals and his final international was an August 2006 friendly match against France.

Punditry 
After retiring from professional football in 2012, Salihamidžić started to work as a regular pundit for Sky Deutschland. From summer 2013 to spring 2014, he worked as a football expert for RTL and was a color commentator for  during the 2013 Audi Cup. He was also an expert for ZDF from February 2014 until the UEFA Champions League Final and during the 2014 FIFA World Cup in Brazil.

Administrative career 
On 31 July 2017, Salihamidžić was appointed sporting director of Bayern Munich, his predecessor Matthias Sammer had retired for health and family reasons a season ago in 2016. Salihamidžić signed a three-year contract until 30 June 2020. Bayern's Chairman, Karl-Heinz Rummenigge said, "In Hasan, we have brought a man to FC Bayern who knows the club very well. He is a very hard-working, serious, loyal and very alert person with great integrity and he speaks five languages. His time in Italy means he has a great network that will definitely be very helpful in his job. We have complete confidence that he will be able to do the job as he should do." Salihamidžić officially assumed his position on Bayern's executive board on 1 July 2020 as the "board director of sport".

Personal life 
Salihamidžić has three children: Selina, Nick and Lara June, all born in Munich, with his wife, Esther Copado. Footballer Francisco Copado is his brother-in-law, whose son Lucas (Salihamidžić's nephew) is a footballer for Bayern Munich, alongside Salihamidžić's own son, Nick.

Salihamidžić also holds German citizenship.

Career statistics

Club 
Source:

International 

Scores and results list Bosnia and Herzegovina's goal tally first.

Honours

Club 
Bayern Munich
 Bundesliga: 1998–99, 1999–2000, 2000–01, 2002–03, 2004–05, 2005–06
 DFB-Pokal: 1999–2000, 2002–03, 2004–05, 2005–06
 DFB-Ligapokal: 1998, 1999, 2000, 2004
 UEFA Champions League: 2000–01
 Intercontinental Cup: 2001

Individual 
 Bosnia and Herzegovina Sportsperson of the Year: 2001
 Bosnian Footballer of the Year: 2000, 2004, 2005, 2006

References

External links 

 
 
 
 

1977 births
Living people
People from Jablanica, Bosnia and Herzegovina
Bosniaks of Bosnia and Herzegovina
Yugoslav Wars refugees
Association football midfielders
Association football fullbacks
Bosnia and Herzegovina footballers
Bosnia and Herzegovina international footballers
Hamburger SV II players
Hamburger SV players
FC Bayern Munich footballers
Juventus F.C. players
VfL Wolfsburg players
Regionalliga players
Bundesliga players
Serie A players
UEFA Champions League winning players
Bosnia and Herzegovina expatriate footballers
Bosnia and Herzegovina expatriate sportspeople in Germany
Expatriate footballers in Germany
Bosnia and Herzegovina expatriate sportspeople in Italy
Expatriate footballers in Italy
Association football commentators
Color commentators
German sports broadcasters
German television journalists
RTL Group people
ZDF people
FC Bayern Munich non-playing staff
FC Bayern Munich board members